Through the Hill is an album composed and performed by Andy Partridge and Harold Budd.

Track listing 
Prelude
1. "Hand 19" – 1:22
Geography
2. "Through the Hill" – 4:07
3. "Great Valley of Gongs" – 3:09
4. "Western Island of Apples" – 3:05
5. "Anima Mundi" – 4:46
Interlude
6. "Hand 20" – 3:02
Structures
7. "The Place of Odd Glances" – 3:19
8. "Well for the Sweat of the Moon" – 3:26
9. "Tenochtitlan's Numberless Bridges" – 3:57
10. "Ceramic Avenue" – 5:20
Interlude
11. "Hand 21" – 1:55
Artifacts
12. "Missing Pieces to the Game of Salt and Onyx" – 6:01
13. "Mantle of Peacock Bones" – 2:09
14. "Bronze Coins Showing Genitals" - 4:20
15. "Bearded Aphrodite" - 2:36
Postlude
16. "Hand 22" - 2:25
Bonus Track (Only on 2005 Re-Release)
17. "Bruegel" - 2:40

References 

 Track titles and times taken from the AOL Music Now page for this album.

Harold Budd albums
1994 albums
Ambient albums
All Saints Records albums
Hannibal Records albums